Reis is a common surname in the Portuguese language, namely in Portugal and Brazil. It was originally a  Christian devotional family name of the Middle Ages, probably due to the Portuguese name for the Biblical Magi, the Reis Magos (the Magi Kings). Sometimes the surname is dos Reis (of the Kings). The Reis surname does not denote a single genealogical origin and there are many families bearing that surname. The Reis etymology is probably from the Latin Rex ("King"), and it is noticeable that it has relations with the German Reich ("Kingdom, Empire"), and the Dutch Rijk (also "Kingdom, Empire"), the Germanic names Rick, Rich, Richard, etc. The Spanish version of this surname is Reyes.

Reis is also a common surname in the German language (where its alternative meaning is "rice"), a historically famous epithet derived from military rank in Turkey (e.g., Piri Reis), and was also used by some European Jews.

It is a name associated with a great number of people:

Alves dos Reis (1896–1955), Portuguese financial criminal
António Reis (1927–1991), Portuguese film director
Antônio Augusto Ribeiro Reis Júnior (born 1975), Brazilian footballer better known as Juninho Pernambucano
Claire Raphael Reis (1888–1978), American music promoter
Reis (footballer) (born 1988), nickname of Deivdy Reis Marques do Nascimento, Brazilian footballer
 Dilermando Reis (1916–1977), Brazilian guitarist and composer
Gabriel Reis (born 1984), Brazilian water polo player
Irving Reis (1906–1953), radio and film director
Johann Philipp Reis (1834–1874), German scientist and inventor
John Reis (born 1969), American musician
Jonathan Reis (born 1990), football player
Matt Reis (born 1975), American soccer player
 Max Reis, chemical engineer and President of the Technion – Israel Institute of Technology
Micaela Reis (born 1988), Angolan model
Michelle Monique Reis (born 1970), Hong Kong actress
Nando Reis (born 1963), Brazilian rock bass/acoustic guitarist
Nicolau dos Reis Lobato (1946–1978), East Timorese politician
Paola Reis (born 1999), Brazilian BMX rider
Ricardo Reis (born 1978), one of the Portuguese poet Fernando Pessoa's heteronyms
Roberto Esser dos Reis, Brazilian ichthyologist
Rodrigo Junqueira dos Reis (born 1975), Brazilian actor
Ron Reis (born 1969), American professional wrestler
Ronni Reis (born 1966), American tennis player

Surnames
Galician-language surnames
German-language surnames
Portuguese-language surnames